McPherson County (standard abbreviation: MP) is a county located in the U.S. state of Kansas.  As of the 2020 census, the county population was 30,223. The largest city and county seat is McPherson. The county is named for Civil War General James B. McPherson.

History

Early history

For many millennia, the Great Plains of North America was inhabited by nomadic Native Americans. From the 16th century to 18th century, the Kingdom of France claimed ownership of large parts of North America. In 1762, after the French and Indian War, France secretly ceded New France to Spain, per the Treaty of Fontainebleau. In 1802, Spain returned most of the land to France, but keeping title to about 7,500 square miles.

In 1803, most of the land for modern day Kansas was acquired by the United States from France as part of the 828,000 square mile Louisiana Purchase for 2.83 cents per acre. In 1848, after the Mexican–American War, the Treaty of Guadalupe Hidalgo with Spain brought into the United States all or part of land for ten future states, including southwest Kansas. In 1854, the Kansas Territory was organized, then in 1861 Kansas became the 34th U.S. state.

19th century

From the 1820s to 1870s, the Santa Fe Trail passed through, what is now McPherson County. The trail entered the county, east of Canton, then south of Galva, then north of Inman, and west towards Lyons. In 1855, Charles O. Fuller established a ranch adjacent to the Running Turkey Creek Crossing about two miles south and one mile east of Galva. Fuller's Ranch provided accommodations for travelers on the Santa Fe Trail and was probably the first white settlement in McPherson County.

Peketon County was established in 1860, by the passage of a bill by S. N. Wood:  An act to establish Peketon County. Section 1. - That all that territory west of the sixth principal meridian and south of Township 16, in Kansas Territory, be and the same is hereby erected into a county, to be known by the name of Peketon County. On February 17, 1865, Peketon County was abolished, and McPherson County was made a part of Marion County, which extended from the west line of Chase County to the present western boundary of Kansas.

In 1868, Solomon Stephens and L. N. Holmberg were appointed Justices of the Peace—the first officers in what is now McPherson County. The next year (1869) occurred the first election for the township, now the county of McPherson. McPherson was regularly organized as a county in the spring of 1870, a mass meeting being held at Sweadal. Sweadal, the county seat thus selected, was located about one mile and a half southwest of the present site of Lindsborg. In September, however, the County Commissioners resolved to meet at the latter place, McPherson which had already been located some two years.

In April, 1873, a petition was filed for the county seat re-location. It was signed by 483 voters, and a special election was accordingly ordered for June 10. Upon that day, McPherson received 605 votes, New Gottland 325, King City 3 and Lindsborg 1; McPherson's majority over all, 276. In May the McPherson Town Company had offered, as an inducement for the location of the county seat at this point, the free use of rooms for ten years, and the donation of two squares of land on the town site. The offer was accepted the next month, the County Commissioners selecting blocks 56 and 65. Thus the county seat was established at McPherson and has remained since.

As early as 1875, city leaders of Marion held a meeting to consider a branch railroad from Florence. In 1878, Atchison, Topeka and Santa Fe Railway and parties from Marion County and McPherson County chartered the Marion and McPherson Railway Company.  In 1879, a branch line was built from Florence to McPherson, in 1880 it was extended to Lyons, in 1881 it was extended to Ellinwood. The line was leased and operated by the Atchison, Topeka and Santa Fe Railway. The line from Florence to Marion, was abandoned in 1968. In 1992, the line from Marion to McPherson was sold to Central Kansas Railway. In 1993, after heavy flood damage, the line from Marion to McPherson was abandoned. The original branch line connected Florence, Marion, Canada, Hillsboro, Lehigh, Canton, Galva, McPherson, Conway, Windom, Little River, Mitchell, Lyons, Chase, then connected with the original AT&SF main line at Ellinwood.

In 1887, the Chicago, Kansas and Nebraska Railway extended its main line from Herington to Pratt.  This main line connected Herington, Ramona, Tampa, Durham, Waldeck, Canton, Galva, McPherson, Groveland, Inman, Medora, Hutchinson, Whiteside, Partridge, Arlington,  Langdon, Turon, Preston, Natrona, Pratt.  In 1888, this main line was extended to Liberal.  Later, this line was extended to Tucumcari, New Mexico and Santa Rosa, New Mexico, where it made a connection with the Southern Pacific from El Paso, Texas.  The Chicago, Kansas and Nebraska Railway was absorbed by the Chicago, Rock Island and Pacific Railway. This line is also called the "Golden State Route".

20th century
The National Old Trails Road, also known as the Ocean-to-Ocean Highway, was established in 1912, and was routed through Windom, Conway, McPherson.

Geography

Adjacent counties
 Saline County (north)
 Dickinson County (northeast)
 Marion County (east)
 Harvey County (southeast)
 Reno County (southwest)
 Rice County (west)
 Ellsworth County (northwest)

Major highways
  Interstate 135
  U.S. Route 56
  U.S. Route 81
  K-4
  K-61
  K-153

Demographics

The McPherson Micropolitan Statistical Area includes all of McPherson County.

2000 census
As of the census of 2000, there were 29,554 people, 11,205 households, and 7,966 families residing in the county.  The population density was 33 people per square mile (13/km2).  There were 11,830 housing units at an average density of 13 per square mile (5/km2).  The racial makeup of the county was 96.53% White, 0.81% Black or African American, 0.34% Native American, 0.32% Asian, 0.06% Pacific Islander, 0.79% from other races, and 1.16% from two or more races.  1.94% of the population were Hispanic or Latino of any race. 37.1% were of German, 12.9% Swedish, 12.1% American, 6.7% English and 6.3% Irish ancestry according to Census 2000.

There were 11,205 households, out of which 33.00% had children under the age of 18 living with them, 62.50% were married couples living together, 6.00% had a female householder with no husband present, and 28.90% were non-families. 25.50% of all households were made up of individuals, and 11.80% had someone living alone who was 65 years of age or older.  The average household size was 2.49 and the average family size was 2.99.

In the county, the population was spread out, with 25.40% under the age of 18, 10.30% from 18 to 24, 25.20% from 25 to 44, 21.80% from 45 to 64, and 17.30% who were 65 years of age or older.  The median age was 38 years. For every 100 females there were 95.90 males.  For every 100 females age 18 and over, there were 92.90 males.

The median income for a household in the county was $41,138, and the median income for a family was $48,243. Males had a median income of $33,530 versus $21,175 for females. The per capita income for the county was $18,921.  About 4.20% of families and 6.60% of the population were below the poverty line, including 5.20% of those under age 18 and 8.10% of those age 65 or over.

Government

Presidential elections
McPherson county is often carried by Republican candidates. The last time a Democratic candidate has carried this county was in 1964 by Lyndon B. Johnson.

Laws
Following amendment to the Kansas Constitution in 1986, the county remained a prohibition, or "dry", county until 1996, when voters approved the sale of alcoholic liquor by the individual drink with a 30 percent food sales requirement.

Education

Colleges
 McPherson College in McPherson
 Bethany College in Lindsborg
 Central Christian College in McPherson

Unified school districts
 Smoky Valley USD 400
 McPherson USD 418
 Canton-Galva USD 419
 Moundridge USD 423
 Inman USD 448

School district office in neighboring county
 Goessel USD 411
 Little River-Windom USD 444

Museums
 Birger Sandzén Memorial Gallery in Lindsborg
 McCormick-Deering Days Museum in Inman
 McPherson Museum in McPherson
 Lindsborg Old Mill & Swedish Heritage Museum in Lindsborg
 Kansas Motorcycle Museum in Marquette

Communities

Cities

 Canton
 Galva
 Inman
 Lindsborg
 Marquette
 McPherson (county seat) 
 Moundridge
 Windom

Unincorporated communities
† means a Census-Designated Place (CDP) by the United States Census Bureau.
 Conway
 Elyria†
 Groveland
 Johnstown
 New Gottland
 Roxbury†

Ghost towns
 Alta Mills
 Battle Hill
 Christian
 Doles Park
 Elivon
 King City
 Sweadal

Townships
McPherson County is divided into twenty-five townships.  The cities of Lindsborg and McPherson are considered governmentally independent and are excluded from the census figures for the townships.  In the following table, the population center is the largest city (or cities) included in that township's population total, if it is of a significant size.

See also
 List of people from McPherson County, Kansas
 National Register of Historic Places listings in McPherson County, Kansas
 McPherson Valley Wetlands
 Maxwell Wildlife Refuge

References

Notes

Further reading

 Wheeler, Wayne Leland. "An Analysis of Social Change in a Swedish-Immigrant Community: The Case of Lindsborg, Kansas." (PhD dissertation, University of Missouri-Columbia; ProQuest Dissertations Publishing, 1959. 5905657).

County
 Through the Years: A Pictorial History of McPherson County; McPherson Sentinel' Heritage House Publishing Co; 1992.
 McPherson County First Courthouse Built About 1869 or 1870; Lindsborg News-Record; March 30, 1959.
 Pioneer Life and Lore of McPherson County, Kansas; Edna Nyquist; Democratic-Opinion Press; 1932.
 A History of the Church of the Brethren in Kansas (includes McPherson College history); Elmer LeRoy Craik; McPherson Daily; Republican Press; 397 pages; 1922.
 Portrait and Biographical Record of Dickinson, Saline, McPherson, and Marion Counties, Kansas; Chapman Bros; 614 pages; 1893.
 Standard Atlas of McPherson County, Kansas; Geo. A. Ogle & Co; 82 pages; 1921.
 Plat Book of McPherson County, Kansas; North West Publishing Co; 50 pages; 1903.
 Edwards' Atlas of McPherson County, Kansas; John P. Edwards; 51 pages; 1884.

Trails
 The Story of the Marking of the Santa Fe Trail by the Daughters of the American Revolution in Kansas and the State of Kansas; Almira Cordry; Crane Co; 164 pages; 1915. (Download 4MB PDF eBook)
 The National Old Trails Road To Southern California, Part 1 (LA to KC); Automobile Club Of Southern California; 64 pages; 1916. (Download 6.8MB PDF eBook)

Mennonite Settlements
 Impact of Mennonite settlement on the cultural landscape of Kansas; Brenda Martin; Kansas State University; 1985/1988. 
 Mennonite settlement : the relationship between the physical and cultural environment; Susan Movle; University of Utah; 1975/1886.
 Status of Mennonite women in Kansas in their church and home relationships; Eva Harshbarger; Bluffton College; 1925/1945.

External links

County
 
 McPherson County - Directory of Public Officials
Historical
 , from Hatteberg's People'' on KAKE TV news
Maps
 McPherson County Maps: Current, Historic, KDOT
 Kansas Highway Maps: Current, Historic, KDOT
 Kansas Railroad Maps: Current, 1996, 1915, KDOT and Kansas Historical Society

 
Kansas counties
1867 establishments in Kansas
Populated places established in 1867